A net radiometer is a type of actinometer used to measure net radiation (NR) at the Earth's surface for meteorological applications. 
The name net radiometer reflects the fact that it measures the difference between downward/incoming and upward/outgoing radiation from Earth. It is most commonly used in the field of ecophysiology.

See also
radiometer
pyranometer
pyrgeometer
irradiance
Meteo-Technology instrumentation website

References

External links 
 Specifications, drawings and pictures courtesy of Hukseflux Thermal Sensors, www.Hukseflux.com
 Specifications courtesy of Delta OHM www.deltaohm.com
 www.kippzonen.com

Electromagnetic radiation meters
Radiometry

es:Radiómetro Neto
pl:Pyranometr